Snapper(s) may refer to:

Animals
 Lutjanidae, a family of fish known as snappers
Lutjanus campechanus, a fish found in the Gulf of Mexico and the Atlantic coast of the United States
 Bigeye snapper (Lutjanus lutjanus), a fish that primarily lives in the Pacific and Indian Oceans, sometimes known as simply "Snapper"
 Cubera snapper (Lutjanus cyanopterus), native to the western Atlantic Ocean
 Fishes from other families including:
 Australasian snapper, Pagrus auratus, also known as silver seabream
 Eastern nannygai, also known as red snapper, Centroberyx affinis
 Bluefish (Pomatomus saltatrix), of which the smallest are often known as "snappers"
Sebastes, some species of which are known as "Pacific snapper" or "red snapper"
 Chelydridae, a family of freshwater turtles of which both extant species are known as snapping turtles, informally shortened to "snapper"
 Common snapping turtle
 Alligator snapping turtle
 Sistrurus catenatus, also known as black snapper, a snake

Arts and entertainment
 The Snapper (novel), a 1990 novel by Roddy Doyle
 The Snapper (film), a film based on the above novel
 Snapper (video game), a faithful clone of Pac-Man for the BBC Micro
 Snapper Music, a UK record label
 Snapper (band), a New Zealand indie rock band
Snapper (EP)
 Snapper Carr, a character in the DC Universe
 Snapper Foster, a character on the soap opera The Young and the Restless
 Snapper (puzzle), a mechanical puzzle
 Bang snaps or "snappers", a type of novelty firework

Military
 , eight ships of the Royal Navy
 , three ships of the United States Navy
 3M6 Shmel, an anti-tank missile with NATO reporting name AT-1 Snapper
 Sopwith Snapper, a British First World War prototype fighter aircraft

Places
 Snapper Creek, Florida
 Snapper Island (New South Wales), Australia, in Sydney Harbour
 Snapper Island (Queensland), Australia, at the mouth of the Daintree River
 Snapper, a hamlet in the UK that was served by Snapper Halt railway station

Sports
 Long snapper, a specialized player in gridiron football
 Steve "Snapper" Jones (1942–2017), American basketball player and television analyst

Surname
 Ernst Snapper (1913–2017), Dutch-American mathematician

Other uses
 Snapper Inc., a residential lawn care and snow removal equipment company 
 Snapper card, a New Zealand contactless smartcard and USB device

See also 
 Red snapper (disambiguation)
 Snap (disambiguation)